Stephen Hansen (28 September 1701 – 22 January 1770) was a Danish industrialist, businessman and General War Commissioner. He is most known for his involvement with Kronborg Rifle Factory in Hellebæk and for building Hellebækgård as well as the Stephen Hansen Mansion on the harbourfront in Helsingør..

Early life and military career
Hansen was born on 28 September 1701 in the village of Skodsbøl in the Parish of Oddum in western Jutland. Little is known about his early years. In 1728, he was  appointed to quartermaster at the Artillery Regiment and shortly thereafter also to recruitment officer (Danish: Mønsterskriver) and Judge Advocate General (Danish: Auditør) at the Naval Artillery. In 1747, he was appointed to Superior War Commissioner but resigned from the military in 1750 to focus on his civil career as an industrialist and merchant.

Civil career

In 1743, Hansen purchased Hellebækgård and the Hammermøllen industrial enterprise which was in a state of neglect. He expanded the factory and improved operations. He obtained a 20-year monopoly on the manufacture of rifles in Denmark and benefited tremendously from the Seven Year War (1756–1763)when he supplied rifles for the Danish army in Holstein. In 1761, he was appointed to General War Commissioner.

Hansen was also involved in trade on the Garoe Islands on which he had a monopoly from 1750 until 1770. In 1759, he commissioned Philip de Lange to build a Rococo-style mansion in Strandgade in Helsingør.

Last years
In 1765, Hansen sold Kronborg Rifle Factory to the Danish state for 70,000 Rigsdaler and that same year acquired Frydendal Manor at Holbæk. He died on 22 January 1770 and is buried at Frederick's German Church in Copenhagen.

References

Danish industrialists
Danish merchants
People from Ringkøbing-Skjern Municipality
People from Helsingør
1701 births
1770 deaths
18th-century Danish businesspeople
18th-century merchants